This is a list of Los Angeles Historic-Cultural Monuments in South Los Angeles, California. In total, there are over 144 Historic-Cultural Monuments (HCM) in the South Los Angeles region, which includes the historic West Adams, Exposition Park, and University of Southern California campus areas.  It also includes historic sites in Watts (including Simon Rodia's Watts Towers), Baldwin Hills, Crenshaw, Jefferson Park, and Leimert Park.  Further, certain historic sites in Arlington Heights, Harvard Heights and Mid-City neighborhoods below Washington Boulevard are identified by the Los Angeles Department of City Planning as being in South Los Angeles, and are included here. They are designated by the city's Cultural Heritage Commission.  There is also a separate list below identifying other historic sites in the area that have not been designated as HCMs, but which have been recognized as California Historical Landmarks or have been listed on the National Register of Historic Places.

Overview of the Historic-Cultural Monuments in southern Los Angeles

National Historic Landmarks.  The southern portion of Los Angeles includes some of the city's most historic sites, including three National Historic Landmarks.  The sites receiving this high designation are: (1) the Los Angeles Memorial Coliseum, built in 1923, and used as the principal site of the 1932 and 1984 Summer Olympic Games; (2) the Watts Towers (HCM #15), a collection of 17 interconnected structures, two of which reach heights of over 99 feet (30 m), built by Italian immigrant construction worker Simon Rodia in his spare time from 1921 to 1954; and (3) Baldwin Hills Village (HCM #174), an innovative planned community built in the 1930s with large open grassy areas and trees.

Historic West Adams.  The largest concentration of historic sites in the South Los Angeles region is in the West Adams district, along a three-mile stretch of West Adams Boulevard between Arlington Avenue and Figueroa Street.  Though South Los Angeles was once considered one of the poorest sections of the city, the West Adams district was one of the city's most affluent areas from the 1890s through the 1920s.  Many of the area's mansions, Victorian homes, and American Craftsman bungalows have been preserved.  The area's 70 Historic-Cultural Monuments include some of the city's most renowned landmarks, such as oil baron Edward Doheny's Chester Place mansion (HCM #30), the William Andrews Clark Memorial Library (HCM #28) operated by UCLA, the castle-like Stimson House (HCM #212) that survived a dynamite attack in 1896, Frederick Hastings Rindge House (HCM #95) built by a Bostonian who owned all of Malibu, the picturesque Victorian Forthmann House (HCM #103), and the birthplace of two-time U.S. presidential candidate Adlai Stevenson (HCM #35).

Churches.  Many of the city's most recognizable churches are also located in southern Los Angeles, including the domed Second Church of Christ Scientist (HCM #57), the second Catholic church in the city to be consecrated, St. Vincent de Paul (HCM #72), the city's Episcopal cathedral, Saint John's, its Greek Orthodox cathedral, Saint Sophia (HCM #120), the Gothic McCarty Memorial Christian Church, which became one of the first white Protestant churches to be racially integrated in the 1950s, the Lombard Romanesque Second Baptist Church (HCM #200) designed in 1925 by noted African-American architect, Paul R. Williams, and the Richardsonian Romanesque First African Methodist Episcopal Zion Cathedral (HCM #341).

USC and Exposition Park.  To the south of West Adams is the campus of the University of Southern California and Exposition Park.  The important sites in these neighborhoods include the L.A. Coliseum, the Shrine Auditorium (HCM #139) (the site of eleven Academy Awards ceremonies between 1947 and 2001), the Natural History Museum of Los Angeles County, the Exposition Park Rose Garden, and USC's Widney Hall (HCM #70) (the oldest university building in Southern California, in continuous use since 1880).

African-American Music History.  The area also includes sites that have played an important role in the city's musical history.  The Ray Charles Worldwide Offices and Studios were designated as a Historic-Cultural Monument (HCM #776) in 2004, and the Dunbar Hotel (HCM #70) was at the center of the thriving Central Avenue jazz scene in the 1930s and 1940s.  After hosting the first national convention of the NAACP to be held in the western United States, the Dunbar hosted Duke Ellington, Cab Calloway, Billie Holiday, Louis Armstrong, Lionel Hampton, Count Basie, Lena Horne and other jazz legends. Former heavyweight champion Jack Johnson also ran a nightclub at the Dunbar in the 1930s.  And the Lincoln Theatre (HCM #744), built in 1927, was once the crown jewel of Central Avenue, referred to by some as the West Coast's version of New York City's Apollo Theater.

Ralph J. Bunche House.  The Ralph J. Bunche House (HCM #159), boyhood home of Ralph J. Bunche, the first African-American to win the Nobel Peace Prize, has been preserved as a museum.

Vermont Square Branch Library.  The city's oldest library building, the Vermont Square Branch (HCM #264) was built in 1913 in the Vermont Square neighborhood  of South Los Angeles.  It is an Italian Renaissance style building with Prairie style proportions built with a grant from Andrew Carnegie.

Watts Station.  The Watts Station was designated as a Historic-Cultural Monument (HCM #36) shortly after the Watts Riots in 1965.  The old wooden railway station, built in 1904, was the only building along Watts' main thoroughfare (which became known as "Charcoal Alley") to survive the riots.  The station became a symbol of continuity, hope and renewal for the Watts community.

Current and former Historic-Cultural Monuments

Non-HCM sites also recognized
The Historic-Cultural Monuments listed above include many of the most important historic sites in South Los Angeles.  In addition, the Los Angeles Memorial Coliseum is a U.S. National Historic Landmark in the region.  Some other sites and historic districts within the South Los Angeles region have been listed on the National Register of Historic Places or designated as California Historical Landmarks, but were not also listed as HCMs.  These are:

See also

Lists of L.A. Historic-Cultural Monuments
 Historic-Cultural Monuments in Downtown Los Angeles
 Historic-Cultural Monuments on the East and Northeast Sides
 Historic-Cultural Monuments in the Harbor area
 Historic-Cultural Monuments in Hollywood
 Historic-Cultural Monuments in the San Fernando Valley
 Historic-Cultural Monuments in Silver Lake, Angelino Heights, and Echo Park

 Historic-Cultural Monuments on the Westside
 Historic-Cultural Monuments in the Wilshire and Westlake areas

Other
 City of Los Angeles' Historic Preservation Overlay Zones
 National Register of Historic Places listings in Los Angeles
 National Register of Historic Places listings in Los Angeles County
 List of California Historical Landmarks

References

External links

 official Designated L.A. Historic-Cultural Monuments (LAHCM) website — with 'ever-updated' LAHCM list via PDF link.
 Historic-Cultural Monument (HCM) Report for South Los Angeles
 City of Los Angeles Map — via Given Place Media.
 Big Orange Landmarks:  "Exploring the Landmarks of Los Angeles, One Monument at a Time" — online photos and in-depth history of South Los Angeles L.A.H.C.Monuments — Website curator: Floyd B. Bariscale.

 

South
Los Angeles-related lists